North Seal River Airport  is located on the shore of Egenolf Lake adjacent to North Seal River, Manitoba, Canada.

The airport serves Gangler's North Seal River Lodge and Outposts during the summer and early fall.

References

Registered aerodromes in Manitoba